The 62nd Cannes Film Festival was held from 13 May to 24 May 2009. French actress Isabelle Huppert was the President of the Jury. Twenty films from thirteen countries were selected to compete for the Palme d'Or. The awards were announced on 23 May. The film The White Ribbon (Das weiße Band), directed by Michael Haneke won the Palme d'Or.

The festival opened with Pixar's film Up, directed by Pete Docter and Bob Peterson. This marked the first time that an animated film or a film in 3-D opened the festival. The festival closed with Coco Chanel & Igor Stravinsky directed by Jan Kounen.

American director Clint Eastwood became the second recipient of the Honorary Palme d'Or, an award given to directors who had established a significant body of work without ever winning a competitive Palme d'Or.

Juries

Main competition
The following people were appointed as the Jury for the feature films of the 2009 Official Selection:
 Isabelle Huppert (French actress) Jury President
 Asia Argento (Italian actress)
 Nuri Bilge Ceylan (Turkish director)
 Lee Chang-dong (South Korean director)
 James Gray (American director)
 Hanif Kureishi (British screenwriter)
 Shu Qi (Taiwanese actress)
 Robin Wright (American actress)
 Sharmila Tagore (Indian actress)

Un Certain Regard
 Paolo Sorrentino (Italian film director) President
 Uma Da Cunha (Indian casting director & production consultant)
 Julie Gayet (French actress & film producer)
 Piers Handling (Canadian director & CEO of TIFF)
 Marit Kapla (Swedish culture journalist)

Caméra d'Or
 Roschdy Zem (French actor & filmmaker) President
 Diane Baratier (French cinematographer)
 Olivier Chiavassa (Fédération des Industries Techniques)
 Sandrine Ray (French director)
 Charles Tesson (critic)
 Edouard Waintrop (Festival Fribourg)

Cinéfondation and short films
 John Boorman (English director) President
 Bertrand Bonello (French director)
 Férid Boughedir (Tunisian director)
 Leonor Silveira (Portuguese actress)
 Zhang Ziyi (Chinese actress & model)

Official selection

In competition - Feature films
The following feature films competed for the Palme d'Or:

Un Certain Regard
The following films were selected for the competition of Un Certain Regard:

Films out of competition
The following films were selected to be screened out of competition:

Special screenings
The following films were selected for the Special Screenings:

Cinéfondation
The following short films were selected for the competition of Cinéfondation:

Short film competition
The following short films competed for the Short Film Palme d'Or:

Cannes Classics
The Festival Cannes Classics places the spotlight on documentaries about cinema and restored masterworks from the past.

Cinéma de la Plage
The Cinéma de la Plage is a part of the Official Selection. The outdoors screenings at the beach cinema of Cannes are open to the public.

Parallel sections

International Critics' Week
The following films were screened for the 48th International Critics' Week (48e Semaine de la Critique):

Feature film competition

Adieu Gary by Nassim Amaouche (France)
Altiplano by Peter Brosens, Jessica Woodworth (Belgium, Germany, Netherlands)
Huacho by Alejandro Fernández Almendras (Chile, France, Germany)
Lost Persons Area by Caroline Strubbe (Belgium)
Mal día para pescar by Álvaro Brechner (Uruguay, Spain)
Ordinary People by Vladimir Perisic (Serbia, France, Switzerland)
Whisper with the Wind (Sirta la gal ba) by Shahram Alidi (Iraq)

Short film competition

It's Free for Girls (C’est gratuit pour les filles) by Marie Amachoukeli, Claire Burger (France)
Logorama by François Alaux, Hervé de Crécy, Ludovic Houplain (H5) (France)
Noche adentro by Pablo Lamar (Paraguay, Argentina)
Runaway by Cordell Barker (Canada)
Seeds of the Fall (Slitage) by Patrik Eklund (Sweden)
Together by Eicke Bettinga (Germany, United Kingdom)
Tulum (La Virée) by Dalibor Matanic (Croatia)

Special screenings

Hierro by Gabe Ibáñez (Spain)
Lascars (Round da Way) by Albert Pereira-Lazaro, Emmanuel Klotz (France)
The Ordinary People (Rien de personnel) by Mathias Gokalp (France)

Short films

1989 by Camilo Matiz (Colombia)
6 Hours by Seong-hyeok Moon (South Korea)
La Baie du renard by Grégoire Colin (France)
Elo by Vera Egito (Brazil)
Espalhadas pelo Ar (Spread Through the Air) by Vera Egito (Brazil)
Faiblesses by Nicolas Giraud (France)
Les Miettes (Crumbs) by Pierre Pinaud (France)

Directors' Fortnight
The following films were screened for the 2009 Directors' Fortnight (Quinzaine des Réalizateurs):

Feature films

Ajami by Scandar Copti, Yaron Shani
Amreeka by Cherien Dabis
Carcasses by Denis Côté
Change Nothing (Ne change rien) by Pedro Costa
Christmas (Navidad) by Sebastián Lelio
Daddy Longlegs (Go Get Some Rosemary) by Benny Safdie, Josh Safdie
Daniel y Ana by Michel Franco
Eastern Plays by Kamen Kalev
The French Kissers (Les Beaux Gosses) by Riad Sattouf
Here by Tzu Nyen Ho
Humpday by Lynn Shelton
I Love You Phillip Morris by Glenn Ficarra, John Requa
I Killed My Mother (J’ai tué ma mère) by Xavier Dolan
Karaoke by Chris Chong Chan Fui
The King of Escape (Le Roi de l’évasion) by Alain Guiraudie
Like You Know It All (Jal Aljido Motamyunseo) by Hong Sangsoo
The Misfortunates (De helaasheid der dingen) by Felix van Groeningen
Oxhide II by Liu Jia Yin
La Pivellina by Rainer Frimmel, Tizza Covi
Polytechnique by Denis Villeneuve
La Terre de la folie by Luc Moullet
Tetro by Francis Ford Coppola
The Wolberg Family (La Famille Wolberg) by Axelle Ropert
Yuki & Nina by Hippolyte Girardot, Nobuhiro Suwa

Special screenings
Hotaru by Naomi Kawase
Montparnasse by Mikhaël Hers
Short films

American Minor by Charlie White (8 min)
Anna by Rúnar Rúnarsson (35 min)
El ataque de los robots de Nebulosa-5 by Chema García Ibarra (7 min)
Canção de amor e saúde by João Nicolau (35 min)
Cicada by Amiel Courtin-Wilson (9 min)
Drömmar från skogen by Johannes Nyholm (9 min)
Dust Kid by Jung Yumi (10 min)
The Fugitives by Guillaume Leiter (25 min)
The History of Aviation by Bálint Kenyeres (15 min)
Jagdfieber (The Hunting Fever) by Alessandro Comodin (22 min)
John Wayne Hated Horses by Andrew T. Betzer (10 min)
Nice by Maud Alpi (25 min)
SuperBarroco by Renata Pinheiro (17 min)
Thermidor by Virgil Vernier (17 min)

Awards

Official awards
The following films and people received the 2009 Official selection awards:
 Palme d'Or: The White Ribbon (Das weiße Band) by Michael Haneke
 Grand Prix: A Prophet (Un prophète) by Jacques Audiard
 Best Director Award: Brillante Mendoza for Kinatay
 Best Screenplay Award: Mei Feng for Spring Fever
 Best Actress Award: Charlotte Gainsbourg for Antichrist
 Best Actor Award: Christoph Waltz for Inglourious Basterds 
 Prix du Jury:
 Thirst (Bakjwi) by Park Chan-wook
 Fish Tank by Andrea Arnold
 Lifetime Achievement Award for his work: Alain Resnais
Un Certain Regard
 Prix Un Certain Regard: Dogtooth (Kynodontas) by Yorgos Lanthimos
 Un Certain Regard Jury Prize: Police, Adjective (Politist, Adjectiv) by Corneliu Porumboiu
 Un Certain Regard Special Jury Prize:
 No One Knows About Persian Cats (Kasi as gorbehaie Irani khabar nadare) by Bahman Ghobadi
 Father of My Children (Le père de mes enfants) by Mia Hansen-Løve
Cinéfondation
 First Prize: Bába by Zuzana Kirchnerová
 2nd Prize: Goodbye by Fang Song
 3rd Prize: Diploma by Yaelle Kayam and Nammae Ui Jip by Jo Sung-hee
Golden Camera
 Caméra d'Or: Samson and Delilah by Warwick Thornton
 Caméra d'Or - Special Distinction: Ajami by Scandar Copti and Yaron Shani
Short films
 Short Film Palme d'Or: Arena by João Salaviza
 Short Film Special Distinction: The Six Dollar Fifty Man by Mark Albiston, Louis Sutherland

Independent awards
FIPRESCI Prizes
 The White Ribbon (Das weiße Band) by Michael Haneke (In Competition)
 Police, Adjective (Poliţist, Adjectiv) by Corneliu Porumboiu (Un Certain Regard)
 Amreeka by Cherien Dabis (Directors' Fortnight)
Vulcan Award of the Technical Artist
 Vulcan Award: Aitor Berenguer (sound mixer) for Map of the Sounds of Tokyo (Mapa de los sonidos de Tokyo)
Ecumenical Jury
 Prize of the Ecumenical Jury: Looking for Eric by Ken Loach
 Prize of the Ecumenical Jury - Special Mention: The White Ribbon (Das weiße Band) by Michael Haneke
Awards in the frame of International Critics' Week
 Critics Week Grand Prize: Adieu Gary by Nassim Amaouche
 SACD Award: Lost Persons Area by Caroline Strubbe
 ACID/CCAS Award: Whisper with the wind (Sirta la gal ba) by Shahram Alidi
 OFAJ/TV5MONDE Young Critics Award: Whisper with the wind (Sirta la gal ba) by Shahram Alidi
 Canal+ Gran Prix for short film: Seeds of the Fall (Slitage) by Patrik Eklund
 Kodak Discovery Award for Best Short Film: Logorama by François Alaux, Hervé de Crécy, Ludovic Houplain (H5)
Other awards
 Regards Jeunes Prize: Whisper with the wind (Sirta la gal ba) by Shahram Alidi
Association Prix François Chalais
 Prix François Chalais: No One Knows About Persian Cats by Bahman Ghobadi

References

External links

 2009 Cannes Film Festival (web.archive)
 Official website Retrospective 2009
 Cannes Film Festival Awards for 2009 at Internet Movie Database

Cannes Film Festival
Cannes Film Festival
Cannes Film Festival
Cannes Film Festival
Cannes Film Festival